Pireh (also Romanized as Pīreh; also known as Bīreh) is a village in Sangar Rural District, in the Central District of Faruj County, North Khorasan Province, Iran. At the 2006 census, its population was 105, in 27 families.

References 

Populated places in Faruj County